St Pius X College may refer to:

 St Pius X College, Magherafelt, in Northern Ireland
 St Pius X College, Sydney, in Australia